Tessa Padden is a Deaf British television presenter and management training consultant. Padden formerly presented the Deaf News segment of a Deaf magazine programme for the BBC, See Hear.

Padden is a former British Sign Language (BSL) Quality and Training Manager at SignPost BSL. During the European Conference in Brussels in February 2004, Padden was Head of Sign Language Services for Independent Media Signing (IMS). She was the founding chair of the BDA's BSL Institute and is a founding member of the BDA's Sign Academy. She was the first Deaf person to present a signed news item on a mainstream news programme, on Channel 4.

References

External links
See Hear

British television presenters
Deaf television presenters
Living people
English deaf people
Year of birth missing (living people)
BSL users